Dzülhami or simply Dzülha is a Chakhesang Naga village in the Phek District of the Indian state of Nagaland.

Demographics
Dzülhami is situated in the Sekrüzu Circle of Phek District in Nagaland. As per the population Census 2011, there are total 707 families residing in Dzülhami. The total population of Dzülhami is 2,823.

Notable people 
 Chekrovolü Swüro, Sportsperson and 2013 Arjuna Award Winner 
 Lhüthiprü Vasa (died. 1993), Politician and Member of the Nagaland Legislative Assembly

References

Cities and towns in Phek district